Staraya Russa is a town in Novgorod Oblast, Russia, located on the Polist River,  south of Veliky Novgorod, the administrative center of the oblast. Its population has steadily decreased over the past years, going from 41,538 recorded in the 1989 Census to 35,511 in the 2002 Census to 31,809 in the 2010 Census.

Etymology
The origin of the name of Staraya Russa is unclear. The most involved and widespread hypothesis was presented by philologists and linguists R. A. Akheyeva, V. L. Vasilyev, and M.V. Gorbanevsky. According to this hypothesis, Russa comes from Rus'—a Slavic people, who settled in the vicinity to control trade routes leading from Novgorod to Polotsk and Kiev—which, in turn, is usually thought to originate from an Old Norse term for "the men who row" (rods-) as rowing was the main method of navigating the rivers of Eastern Europe, and that it could be linked to the Swedish coastal area of Roslagen (the rowing crews) or Roden, as it was known in earlier times. Staraya is Russian for "Old".

History

Thought to have originated in the mid-10th century, it was first mentioned as Rusa (Cyrillic: Руса) in chronicles for the year 1167 as one of three main towns of the Novgorod Republic, alongside Pskov and Ladoga. After Pskov became independent, Russa became the second most important town and trade center of the Novgorod Republic after Novgorod itself. By the end of the 15th century, it contained about one thousand homesteads. Brine springs made the saltworks the principal business activity in the town, which was the biggest center of salt industry in the Novgorod region.

The wooden fortifications of Russa burned to ashes in 1190 and then in 1194, after which they were replaced by the stone fortress. In 1478, it was incorporated into the Grand Duchy of Moscow together with Novgorod. The word Staraya (Old) was prefixed to the name in the 15th century, to distinguish it from newer settlements called Russa. Nevertheless, the current name firmly established only in the 19th century, when the salt mining settlements around the town became collectively known as Novaya Russa (New Russa).

When Ivan the Terrible ascended the throne in 1533, Staraya Russa was a populous town. During the Time of Troubles, it was held by Polish brigands and heavily depopulated. Only 38 people lived there in 1613.

In the course of the administrative reform carried out in 1708 by Peter the Great, Staraya Russa was included into Ingermanland Governorate (known since 1710 as St. Petersburg Governorate). In 1727, separate Novgorod Governorate was split off. In 1776, Staraya Russa became the seat of Starorussky Uyezd of Novgorod Viceroyalty. In 1796, the viceroyalty was transformed into Novgorod Governorate.

Catherine II appointed German mineralogy expert Franz Ludwig von Cancrin as director of the salt-works in 1783. In the 1820s, military settlements were organized in Staraya Russa and around, in accordance with the project designed by Aleksey Arakcheyev, an influential statesman. It was inconvenient to have both civil and military administration in Staraya Russa, and therefore the uyezd was abolished in 1824. The town of Staraya Russa and some adjacent territories were directly subordinated to the Defense Ministry. The military settlements were proven inefficient, in particular, in 1831, the area participated in the Cholera Riots. They were abolished in 1856. In 1857, Starorussky Uyezd was re-established.

Soviet authority in Staraya Russa was established on November 5(18), 1917.

In August 1927, the uyezds were abolished and, effective October 1, 1927, Starorussky District was established, with the administrative center in Staraya Russa. Novgorod Governorate was abolished as well and the district became a part of Novgorod Okrug of Leningrad Oblast. On July 23, 1930, the okrugs were abolished and the districts were directly subordinated to the oblast.

On September 19, 1939, Staraya Russa was elevated in status to that of a town of oblast significance and thus ceased to be a part of the district. The town was occupied by the Germans between August 9, 1941 and February 18, 1944. Totally destroyed during the war, it was later restored. On July 5, 1944, Staraya Russa was transferred to newly established Novgorod Oblast and remained there ever since.

Administrative and municipal status
Within the framework of administrative divisions, Staraya Russa serves as the administrative center of Starorussky District, even though it is not a part of it. As an administrative division, it is, together with two rural localities, incorporated separately as the Town of oblast significance of Staraya Russa—an administrative unit with the status equal to that of the districts (one of the three in Novgorod Oblast). As a municipal division, the town of oblast significance of Staraya Russa is incorporated within Starorussky Municipal District as Staraya Russa Urban Settlement.

Climate

Economy

Industry
The biggest enterprise in Staraya Russa is the aircraft repair works. The mechanical engineering plant went bankrupt in 2011 and no longer exists.

Transportation
A railway which connects Bologoye and Pskov passes through Staraya Russa.

Staraya Russa is connected by roads with Novgorod, Demyansk, and Bezhanitsy via Kholm. There are also local roads.

There is a wharf on the Polist River in the Lake Ilmen basin. The Polist is navigable downstream from Staraya Russa.

The town is served by the Staraya Russa Airport.

Attractions
Staraya Russa is a spa. A summer residence of the Russian novelist Fyodor Dostoyevsky, who wrote his novels The Brothers Karamazov and Demons there, is open to visitors as a museum.

Monuments include the Transfiguration Monastery, which includes a cathedral built in seventy days in 1198 and partly rebuilt in the 15th century, and several 17th-century buildings and churches. The principal city cathedral (1678) is dedicated to the Resurrection of Christ. Other notable churches are consecrated to St. George (1410) (the Dostoyevsky family stayed in the house of the priest of this church), Mina the Martyr (14th century), and the Holy Trinity (1676).

Notable people
Sergei Rachmaninoff was born in 1873, in the family estate in the village of Semyonovo, near Staraya Russa. His birth was registered in Semyonovo church book and signed by Priest Platon Savitsky and acolyte Peter Lubochsky
Fedor Dostoyevsky owned a house in Staraya Russa.

References

Citations

General sources

External links

 Official website of Staraya Russa 
 General description and sights 
 

Cities and towns in Novgorod Oblast
Novgorod Republic
Spa towns in Russia
Starorussky Uyezd